Sanghyang Adi Buddha is a concept of God in Indonesian Buddhism. This term was used by Ashin Jinarakkhita at the time of Buddhist revival in Indonesia in the mid-20th century to reconcile the first principle of the official philosophical foundation of Indonesia (Pancasila), i.e. Ketuhanan Yang Maha Esa (lit. "Recognition of the Divine Omnipotence") that requires the belief in a supreme God, which Buddhism, strictly speaking, does not believe in. This concept is used by the Indonesian Buddhist Council, an organization that seeks to represent all Buddhist traditions in Indonesia such as Theravada, Mahayana, and Vajrayana.

Adi-Buddha is a term used in Tantric Buddhism to refer to the Primordial Buddha. The term Sanghyang Adi Buddha is agreed upon and used by the Indonesian Supreme Sangha and the Indonesian Buddhist Council as the designation for God Almighty. This term is not found in Pāli Canon, but used in some old Indonesian Vajrayana texts such as Sanghyang Kamahayanikan.

Conception
Sang Hyang Adi Buddha refers to "the seed of Buddhahood" inside every being. In Mahayana Buddhism, Adi Buddha refers to the primordial Buddha that outlines the same Universal Dhamma. The Adi-buddha is not a monotheistic deity as in the Abrahamic traditions, but is rather the primordial nature of mind, the part of the mind that never enters samsara, and is thus the "primordial Buddha." As the Primordial Buddha never entertains conceptual ignorance or proliferation, all that arises is referred to as "self-liberated." Sogyal Rinpoche writes:"[Kuntuzangpo] represents the absolute, naked, sky-like primordial purity of the nature of our mind.""

For the purposes of official recognition as a religion by the state, Mahabhiksu Ashin Jinarakkhita encouraged Indonesian Buddhists to present the Adi-Buddha as: "a concept of “supreme divinity” in the Dharma that would be most readily recognizable and acceptable to predominantly Muslim authorities."

Adi-Buddha is the Primordial Buddha, or Paramadi Buddha (The first and incomparable Buddha). He has some other names in other Buddhist traditions such as Adau‐Buddha (Primordial Buddha), Anadi‐Buddha (Uncreated Buddha), Uru‐Buddha (Buddha of the Buddhas). He also called Adinatha (The first Protector), Svayambhulokanatha (self-originating World Protector), Vajradhara (Vajra Holder), Vajrasattva (Vajra Being), Svayambhu (the Self-Originating One), or Sanghyang Adwaya (Unequalled). In Chinese language, Adi‐Buddha is Pen‐chu‐fu, while aramadi‐Buddha is translated as Sheng‐chu‐fu. In Tibet Dan‐pohi‐sans‐rgyas, Mchog‐gi‐dan‐pohi‐sans‐rgyas, or Thogmahi‐sans‐rgyas are all refers to "Buddha of the Buddhas", that existed since the beginning, as the first: Paramadi‐buddhoddhrta‐sri‐kalacakra‐nama‐tantraraja and Jnanasattva‐manjusryadi‐buddha‐nama‐sadhana.

Mahayana Buddhism believes that Buddha has three bodies (Trikaya), i.e.: "The Created Body" (Nirmanakaya) to teach common human being; "Body of Mutual Enjoyment" (Sambhogakāya) or the body of bliss or clear light; and "Truth Body" (Dharmakāya) which is eternal, omnipresent, non-individual, almighty, non-dual, and self-originating (svabhava‐kaya). There may be many Buddhas, but only one Dharmakaya. This Dharmakaya is identical with Adi‐Buddha. The sources of this Trikaya doctrine are Avatamsaka Sutra and Mahayana‐sraddhotpada‐shastra. The last one was the work of Asvagosha, a monk who lived around the first century AD. Vetulyaka Lokottaravada School says that Sakyamuni originally was the manifestation of Adi‐Buddha in this world. Herman S. Hendro (1968) wrote:
"Dalam Kitab Sutji Sang Hyang Kamahayanikan, pupuh ke-19 didjelaskan bahwa Sang Buddha Gautama telah menunggal dengan Sang Hyang Adhi Buddha atau dengan kata lain bahwa Sang Buddha Gautama adalah pengedjawantahan dari Sang Adhi Buddha. Karena itu bila kita menjebut Sang Adhi Buddha maka itu adalah Sang Buddha jang tidak berkarya (saguna)."
"In the Sacred Book of Sanghyang Kamahayanikan, 19th stanza, is explained that the Buddha Gautama was merged with Sang Hyang Adhi Buddha, or in other words the Buddha Gautama was the manifestation of the Adhi Buddha. Therefore if we refers the Adhi Buddha then He is the Buddha who is inactive (saguna)."

With his power, he emanates into five Dhyani Buddhas. The Pure Land of the Adi Buddha is called Ogamin in Tibetan or Akanistha in Sanskrit (lit. "not down" or "without (back) to the bottom").

Buddhist concept
In Udana Nikaya (viii: 3), Sakyamuni gave his teaching:

From the Pali language: Athi Ajatam Adbhutam Akatam Samkhatamor "the Unborn, Unoriginated, Uncreated, and Absolute One". The Primordial Buddha is something without ego (anatta), unpersonified, and indescribable in any form. But for there is the Absolute, the unconditioned (Asamkhatam), one can attain the freedom from the wheel of life (samsara) by meditating.
 The Indonesian Supreme Sangha describes God in Buddhism and (for the purposes of state recognition as a religion) defines God as "the source of everything that exists": Almighty, eternal, everything in the universe are His exposition, intangible and doesn't manifest Himself.

Indonesian National Encyclopedia
Indonesian National Encyclopedia (1988) describes Adi Buddha and the traditions that are used this term thus:

The Seeker's Glossary of Buddhism
The Seeker's Glossary of Buddhism gives the following definition for Adi Buddha:

Indonesia
Since the time of Sailendra and Mataram Kingdom, Indonesian Buddhists have the same belief in the existence of the Adi-Buddha as the Buddhists in Tibet, Nepal, and the northern schools. Nepalese uses the term Adinata, which means "main protector" and Swayambhulokanatta, which means "the unborn protector of the universe". The Tibetan familiar with terms such as Vajradhara (Tibet= Dorjechang; lit. "ruler of all the mysteries"). Namasangiti Text of Candrakīrti (a monk who was staying in Indonesia), and the symbolism of Borobudur's mandala stupa, provided evidence that the Buddhism embraced by Indonesian people since the days of Srivijaya, Ancient Mataram, Sailendra, and Majapahit is the Buddhism which honors the Primordial Buddha.

Some Indonesian sacred texts which contains the name of Sanghyang Adi Buddha are:

 Guna Karanda Vyuha text

 Sanghyang Kamahayanikan text

Herman S. Hendro (1968) in his paper mentioned:

Modern Indonesia

Since Indonesian independence in 1945, the founders of this new state had agreed on a proposed ideology as a national foundation for uniting all ethnicities, religions, and races, i.e. Pancasila as the basic foundation of the state and nationhood. The first precept of Pancasila is "Belief in the Almighty Godliness" ("Recognition of the Divine Omnipotence").<ref group="note">The Indonesian word "Tuhan" usually is translated into "God" or "Lord". "Tuhan" is a noun while "Ketuhanan" is an adjective. Wilis in her paper cited: With the addition of prefix and suffix, it changes the noun into an adjective “Ketuhanan” or “Lordness.” Page 3, 4.</ref> The majority of Indonesian people mistranslated the sanskrit "Esa" -Almighty (absolute in virtues)- as "Eka" -One. This misconceptions makes some factions questioning the doctrine of Buddhism whether it acknowledges the Belief in God Almighty or not.

Following an alleged coup attempt by the Communist Party of Indonesia (PKI) in 1965, Indonesian Government rejects and prohibits the development of all views that correspond to communism or atheism.Library of Congress Country Studies. Indonesia, Buddhism . Consequently, there was some doubt within the Indonesian Government at the time whether Buddhism can be accepted as an official religion. Ashin Jinarakkhita proposed the name of Sanghyang Adi Buddha as the god of Buddhist teachings. He sought confirmation for this uniquely Indonesian version of Buddhism in ancient Javanese texts, and even the shape of the Buddhist temple complex at Borobudur in Jawa Tengah Province. It was submitted to the Minister of Religious Affairs, and the government eventually accepted Buddhism as a state religion in 1978, as stated in GBHN (Outlines of Indonesian State Policy) of 1978, Presidential Decree No. 30 of 1978, and the Form Letter of Indonesian Department of the Interior No.477/74054/1978 (November 18, 1978).

Controversy
The use of Sanghyang Adi Buddha as a name for a supreme God is controversial among Indonesian Buddhists to the present day. The reason is that the concept of Sanghyang Adi Buddha, which only exists in Tantrayana/ Vajrayana traditions, is not a god in the sense of a personal god of the monotheistic religions. The use of the name of Sanghyang Adi Buddha as a personal god, is the product of a compromise with political reality, and is contrary to the teachings of Buddhism.  Because of this political compromise, Indonesian Buddhism differs from mainstream Buddhism.  This controversy also extends to Very Venerable Ashin Jinarakkhita as the originator of the term Sanghyang Adi Buddha as a god in Buddhism.

While the State seemed to be easily satisfied with Ashin Jinarakkhita's assurance, questions came from their fellow Buddhists and, later, also his primary disciples who were on the same boat with him in the beginning. Since then, debates, disintegration, and splits could not be avoided within Buddhist organizations. The strongest opposition was coming from the Theravādin members, and it seemed to happen partly because of the influence of the Thai Buddhist’s purification movement started in the nineteenth century by King Mongkut as later on many Thai Bhikkhus coming to Indonesia. Though there were also Buddhist monks coming from Sri Lanka and Myanmar, such as Narada Mahathera, Mahasi Sayadaw and other Sangha members, they only came a few times during these early years.

In the same year when the controversy was erupting (1974), the Indonesian Directorate General Guidance of Hindu-Buddhism (Gde Puja, MA.) issued a resolution on all schools/ traditions of Buddhism that they should believe in the presence of an Almighty God (First precept of Pancasila), and while each of this sects may give different names to Him, He is essentially the same entity. This resolution became indirectly a government imposition of the doctrine of Oneness of God on all schools/ traditions of Buddhism. Any schools/ traditions that do not believe in the existence of One God would be dissolved. This happened to the Mahayana school/ tradition of the monk Sun Karma Chandra which was dissolved on July 21, 1978.

Nowadays, the term of Sanghyang Adi Buddha only used mostly by Indonesian Buddhayana Council and Indonesian Supreme Sangha. Some schools treat the concept indifferently, while the others simply refuse and consider the idea as heresy (especially the Indonesian Theravada Sangha), and only a fraction supports it fully or partially.

Usage

Religious usage

Salutation
Sanghyang Adi Buddha is used in greeting especially by Indonesian Buddhayana Council, i.e. Namo Sanghyang Adi Buddhaya. This salutation was popularized by the late Venerable Mahawiku Dharma-aji Uggadhammo, one of the five first disciples of Ashin Jinarakkhita, whose ordained as the first Indonesian Buddhist monks after the independence of Indonesia.

The complete salutation which is commonly used as a greeting in the books' preface, letters, or meeting is:Namo Sanghyang Adi Buddhaya. Namo Buddhaya, Bodhisatvaya Mahasatvaya.The salutation on the PREFACE of Paguyuban Wulan Bahagia and East Java Indonesian Buddhist Council's magazine is Namo SangHyang Adi Buddhaya, Namo Buddhaya.

Vandana
The tribute to Sanghyang Adi Buddha is often included in the vandana (devotion) section of ritual books.
1. VandanaTerpujilah Sanghyang Adi Buddha Tuhan Yang Maha Esa("Homage to Sanghyang Adi Buddha the Almighty God")Terpujilah Bhagavā, Yang Maha Suci, Yang telah mencapai Penerangan Sempurna("Homage to the Blessed One the Worthy One, the Fully Enlightened One")Terpujilah Para Bodhisattva-Mahasattva("Homage to all Holy Beings and Great Beings")

2.VandanaNamo Sanghyang Ādi Buddhaya (3x)"Homage to the Almighty God, shout the whole world"Namo Tassa Bhagavato Arahato Sammā-sambuddhassa (3x)"Homage to the Blessed One the Worthy One, the Fully Enlightened One"Namo Sabbe Bodhisattvāya-Mahāsattvāya (3x)"Homage to all Holy Beings and Great Beings"

Politics
Indonesian Government Regulation Number 21/1975 about the vow of the civil bureaucrat, arranges the vow for the Buddhist bureaucrat by mentions "Demi Sanghyang Adi Buddha''" ("by Sanghyang Adi Buddha") in the beginning of the vow.

Gallery

See also
 Acintya
 Creator in Vajrayana Buddhism
 Creator in Buddhism
 Indonesian Esoteric Buddhism
 Unfinished Buddha

Notes

References

Bibliography
 Brown, Iem (1987). Contemporary Indonesian Buddhism and Monotheism, Journal of Southeast Asian Studies, Vol. 18 (1), 108-117

Buddhas
Buddhism in Indonesia
God in Buddhism